La Plata (Spanish for "the silver") can refer to:

Places

Argentina
La Plata, capital and largest city of Buenos Aires Province
La Plata Partido, a district in Buenos Aires Province
Universidad Nacional de La Plata
La Plata Astronomical Observatory
Mar del Plata, 2nd largest city in Buenos Aires Province
United Provinces of the Río de la Plata
Viceroyalty of the Río de la Plata

Bolivia
Ciudad de la Plata de la Nueva Toledo, old name for Sucre, Bolivia

Colombia
La Plata, Huila, a municipality in Colombia

Spain
La Plata (Seville Metro), a railway station

United States
La Plata, Maryland
La Plata, Missouri
La Plata (Amtrak station)
La Plata, Utah, ghost town
La Plata County, Colorado
Durango-La Plata County Airport
La Plata Mountains, Colorado
La Plata Peak, Colorado

Rivers
Río de la Plata (also: River Plate), in South America
Rio de la Plata Basin, that flows towards the river
Rio de la Plata (Puerto Rico), in Puerto Rico
La Plata River (San Juan River), in the United States

Other
La Plata dolphin, found in coastal Atlantic waters of southeastern South America
Battle of La Plata, in Cuba
La Plata FC, football club from Argentina
1029 La Plata, asteroid